James L. Hill (1834–1888) was Mayor of Madison, Wisconsin. He held the office from 1872 to 1873.

See also
The Political Graveyard

Mayors of Madison, Wisconsin
1834 births
1888 deaths
19th-century American politicians